Gerard Zygfryd Mach (16 September 1926 – 22 September 2015) was a Polish sprinter. He competed in the men's 200 metres and 400 metres at the 1952 Summer Olympics. Before focusing fully on athletics, Mach also played football in Gdańsk before the age of 20, playing for both Gedania Gdańsk and Lechia Gdańsk, making 3 appearances and scoring 2 goals in the league for Lechia.

References

1926 births
2015 deaths
Athletes (track and field) at the 1952 Summer Olympics
Polish male sprinters
Polish athletics coaches
Olympic athletes of Poland
Sportspeople from Gdańsk
People from the Free City of Danzig
Polish emigrants to Canada
Gedania 1922 Gdańsk players
Lechia Gdańsk players
Lechia Gdańsk athletes
20th-century Polish people